Man-Made Monster is a 1941 American science-fiction horror film directed by George Waggner and produced by Jack Bernhard for Universal Pictures. Filmed in black-and-white, it stars Lon Chaney, Jr. (in his horror film debut) and Lionel Atwill. Man-Made Monster was re-released under various titles including Electric Man and The Mysterious Dr. R. Realart Pictures re-released the film in 1953 under the title The Atomic Monster as a double feature with The Flying Saucer (1950). On the film's original main title, there is no hyphen; it's simply Man Made Monster.

The plot resembles The Invisible Ray (1936), The Walking Dead (1936), and two decades later Indestructible Man (1956); that much later feature starred Chaney but was not directly inspired by Man-Made Monster.

Plot
A tragic accident occurs when a bus hits a high power line. The incident has claimed the lives of all on board, except for one Dan McCormick, who survives because he is, surprisingly, immune to the deadly electricity. McCormick does a sideshow exhibit as Dynamo Dan, the Electric Man and is taken in by Dr. John Lawrence, who wants to study him. However, Dr. Lawrence's colleague, mad scientist Dr. Paul Rigas, desires to create an army of electrobiologically-driven zombies. He gives McCormick progressively higher doses of electricity until his mind is ruined and left dependent on the addicting electrical charges. This temporarily gives McCormick the touch of death, making him capable of killing anyone he touches by electrocution. After accidentally killing Lawrence, Rigas ensures McCormick's conviction to see what will happen if he is sent to the electric chair. McCormick survives, and with a super charge in his glowing body encased in a protective rubber suit he kills several people, including Rigas, before becoming entangled on a barbed wire fence which tears his rubber suit, causing the electricity to drain out into the wire and McCormick to die.

Cast

Lionel Atwill as Dr. Paul Rigas
Lon Chaney, Jr. as Dan McCormick
Anne Nagel as June Lawrence
Frank Albertson as Mark Adams
Samuel S. Hinds as Dr. John Lawrence
William B. Davidson as Ralph Stanley, the district attorney
Ben Taggart as Detective sergeant
Constance Bergen as Nurse
Ivan Miller as Doctor
Chester Gan as Wong
George Meader as Dr. Bruno
Frank O'Connor as Detective
John Dilson as Medical examiner
Byron Foulger as Alienist (scene deleted just prior to release)
Russell Hicks as Warden Harris

Production

Back in 1936, Boris Karloff was originally selected for the role of Dan McCormick, with Bela Lugosi playing Dr. Rigas. This earlier version of the film, which was titled The Electric Man, ended up being scrapped because the concept was too similar to another Karloff/Lugosi feature film, The Invisible Ray. The script was then shelved for the next four years before being revived in 1940 under Universal's new management.

When Man-Made Monster finally went into production, the studio considered it a quick, low-budget feature. Shot in three weeks and with an estimated budget of only $86,000, it was one of the cheapest films made by Universal that year. Despite these limitations, however, the filmmakers were still able to achieve some impressive effects, including one that made Lon Chaney appear to glow in the dark.

Reception 
Even though it was only a minor box office success, Man-Made Monster proved to be instrumental for Lon Chaney's career; his performance in the lead role helped him win a contract with Universal. While promoting their new star, Universal's publicity department hinted that history was possibly repeating itself, noting that Chaney's first major horror movie role was shot on the same set that was used for his father's well-known production of The Phantom of the Opera.

Distribution 
In the 1950s, Realart Pictures re-released the film, changing the title to The Atomic Monster in order to take advantage of the latest craze in science fiction and atomic age story lines. This new title, according to writer-producer Alex Gordon, was taken from a spec script he submitted to Realart which had the same name. He sent his attorney Samuel Z. Arkoff to meet the Realart representative James H. Nicholson to discuss the matter. The meeting netted Gordon a quick $1,000 settlement for copyright infringement, but more importantly, the meeting led Gordon, Arkoff, and Nicholson to form their own film company that eventually became American International Pictures. Man Made Monster was released on Blu-ray by Scream Factory on June 16, 2020 as part of their Universal Horror Collection series. It features an informative audio commentary by Tom Weaver and Constantine Nasr.

References

External links 

 
 

1941 films
1941 horror films
American black-and-white films
American monster movies
Mad scientist films
1940s science fiction horror films
Universal Pictures films
Films directed by George Waggner
1940s American films